Lucas Baptista Félix (born 7 May 1997), commonly known as Dentinho, is a Brazilian footballer who plays as a forward for Avaí.

Club career
Born in Cachoeiro de Itapemirim, Espírito Santo, Dentinho began his career with Tigres do Brasil in 2018. In September 2020 season, he moved to hometown side Estrela do Norte.

On 27 January 2021, Dentinho was announced as the new signing of Sousa. A regular starter, he signed for Hercílio Luz in September, for the year's Copa Santa Catarina.

On 6 April 2022, Dentinho agreed to a contract with Série A side Avaí until December 2023. He made his debut in the category four days later, coming on as a late substitute for Jonathan Copete in a 1–0 home win over América Mineiro.

Career statistics

References

External links
Avaí profile 

1997 births
Living people
Brazilian footballers
Sportspeople from Espírito Santo
Association football forwards
Campeonato Brasileiro Série A players
Campeonato Brasileiro Série B players
Campeonato Brasileiro Série D players
Esporte Clube Tigres do Brasil players
Estrela do Norte Futebol Clube players
Sousa Esporte Clube players
Hercílio Luz Futebol Clube players
Avaí FC players
Vila Nova Futebol Clube players